The Bourne Ultimatum: Original Motion Picture Soundtrack is the soundtrack to the 2007 film The Bourne Ultimatum.

Composer John Powell returned as the Bourne composer, having created the scores for the two previous films. Also included is a brand-new version of Moby's "Extreme Ways", titled "Extreme Ways (Bourne's Ultimatum)". Unlike the other two albums of the Hollywood Bourne series, the tracks in this album are not chronologically in order the way they are played in the movie.

Track listing 
 "Six Weeks Ago" – (4:31)
 "Tangiers" – (7:40)
 "Thinking of Marie" – (3:51)
 "Assets and Targets" – (7:18)
 "Faces Without Names" – (3:31)
 "Waterloo" – (10:38)
 "Coming Home" – (3:19)
 "Man Versus Man" – (5:46)
 "Jason Is Reborn" – (4:04)
 "Extreme Ways (Bourne's Ultimatum)" by Moby – (4:22)

Credits 
 Orchestra Conducted By: Gavin Greenaway
 Orchestrated By: Jake Parker, Gary Thomas and David Butterworth
 Additional Music By: John Ashton Thomas and James McKee Smith
 Mixed By: Shawn Murphy
 Edited By: Thomas A. Carlson, Ramiro Belgardt, Peter Myles and Curt Sobel

Instrumentation 
 Strings: 28 violins, 15 violas, 15 violoncellos, 9 double basses
 Woodwinds: 1 bassoon
 Brass: 11 French horns, 3 trombones, 2 bass trombones, 2 contrabass trombones, 3 tubas
 Percussion: 3 players
 2 pianos, organ & ethnic woodwinds

References

2007 soundtrack albums
Jason Bourne
Decca Records soundtracks
John Powell (film composer) soundtracks
Action film soundtracks